Kamal Tabrizi (born 28 October 1959) is an Iranian film director. He was born in Tehran, with his parents having moved there from Tabriz. A newly released picture shows that he was as a photographer and reporter among the 1979 hostage takers at the U.S. Embassy in Tehran. Kamal Tabrizi graduated from Tehran University of Art at Faculty of Cinema and Theater.

Biography 
After graduating from Cinema & TV from Art University in Tehran;He went to the war front of Iran-Iraq war (1981~1989) as a director and photographer and has made his first documentary on war Martyrs which won the best documentary award in Tashkent Film Festival. He taught Cinema and direction in Young Cinema Society and Film making Educational Center for some years and arranged many workshops on cinema. He made his first feature film Passage in 1988. Since then he has made more than 18 feature films, including two co-productions with Japan ("Wind Carpet" (2001) which was the best seller in Iranian market). His feature films and TV series are of the most popular films in Iranian Market and well received and awarded in the international Film Festivals.

Filmography as a director

See also 
 Cinema of Iran

References

External links 
 
 kamal Tabrizi on Instagram

Iranian film directors
People from Tehran
1959 births
Muslim Student Followers of the Imam's Line
Living people
Crystal Simorgh for Best Screenplay winners
20th-century Iranian people
21st-century Iranian people
Tehran University of Art alumni